Pedakallēpalli is a village in Krishna district of the Indian state of Andhra Pradesh. It is located in Mopidevi mandal of Machilipatnam revenue division. It is one of the villages in the mandal to be a part of Andhra Pradesh Capital Region. Susarla Dakshinamurthy, a notable music stalwart is from this place, also, well-known poet/lyricist/songwriter Veturi is from this place.

This place is also known as Dakshina Kasi

See also 
Villages in Mopidevi mandal

References 

Villages in Krishna district